Namma Metro stations

Pantharapalya - Nayandahalli, formerly known as Nayandahalli, is a metro station on the Purple Line of the Namma Metro serving the borders of Banashankari and Mysore Road along with Bangalore University campus. It was inaugurated on 29 August 2021 and commenced to the public on 30 August 2021.

Station layout

Entry/Exit
There are 2 Entry/Exit points - A and B. Commuters can use either of the points for their travel.
Entry/Exit point A - Towards Pantharapalya side
Entry/Exit point B - Towards Nayandahalli Junction side

See also 

 Bangalore
 List of Namma Metro stations
 Transport in Karnataka
 List of metro systems
 List of rapid transit systems in India

 Bangalore portal
Namma Metro stations

References 

